Kaarina Autio (28 July 1941 – 4 February 2013) was a Finnish gymnast. She competed in six events at the 1960 Summer Olympics.

References

External links 
 

1941 births
2013 deaths
Finnish female artistic gymnasts
Olympic gymnasts of Finland
Gymnasts at the 1960 Summer Olympics
Sportspeople from Huittinen
20th-century Finnish women